Aris Thessaloniki finished in the 9th place of Super League and did not qualifie the Play-offs. In Greek Cup Aris Thessaloniki eliminated in fifth round by Atromitos.

The club changed its manager three times. The season started with Sakis Tsiolis but he left the club on October. Michał Probierz was the next manager until January 2012 when Giannis Michalitsos hired as caretaker. Aris Thessaloniki finished the season with Manuel Machado as manager.

First-team squad

Transfers and loans

Transfers in

Transfers out

Loans Out

Friendlies

Competitions

Overall

Overview

{| class="wikitable" style="text-align: center"
|-
!rowspan=2|Competition
!colspan=8|Record
|-
!
!
!
!
!
!
!
!
|-
| Super League 1

|-
| Greek Cup

|-
! Total

Managers' overview

Sakis Tsiolis
{| class="wikitable" style="text-align: center"
|-
!rowspan=2|Competition
!colspan=8|Record
|-
!
!
!
!
!
!
!
!
|-
| Super League 1

|-
| Greek Cup

|-
! Total

Michał Probierz
{| class="wikitable" style="text-align: center"
|-
!rowspan=2|Competition
!colspan=8|Record
|-
!
!
!
!
!
!
!
!
|-
| Super League 1

|-
| Greek Cup

|-
! Total

Giannis Michalitsos
{| class="wikitable" style="text-align: center"
|-
!rowspan=2|Competition
!colspan=8|Record
|-
!
!
!
!
!
!
!
!
|-
| Super League 1

|-
| Greek Cup

|-
! Total

Manuel Machado
{| class="wikitable" style="text-align: center"
|-
!rowspan=2|Competition
!colspan=8|Record
|-
!
!
!
!
!
!
!
!
|-
| Super League 1

|-
| Greek Cup

|-
! Total

Super League

Regular season

League table

Results summary

Matches

Greek Cup

Aris Thessaloniki entered in fourth round like all teams of Super League

Fourth Round

Fifth Round

Squad statistics

Appearances

Goals

Clean sheets 
If a goalkeeper was substituted and he did not conceded a goal while he was in the game but the team conceded a goal after him, the goalkeeper would not claim the clean sheet.

Kit

|
|
|
|
|

References

External links
 Aris Thessaloniki F.C. official website
 Aris Thessaloniki FC on Superleaguegreece.net

2011-12
Greek football clubs 2011–12 season